Dylan Stanley (born 5 August 1991) is a South African cricketer. He made his first-class debut for Northerns in the 2009–10 CSA Provincial Three-Day Challenge on 4 March 2010.

References

External links
 

1991 births
Living people
South African cricketers
Free State cricketers
Northerns cricketers
Cricketers from Johannesburg